Statistics of Swedish football Division 2 for the 1949–50 season.

League standings

Division 2 Nordöstra 1949–50 
Teams from a large part of northern Sweden, approximately above the province of Medelpad, were not allowed to play in the national league system until the 1953–54 season, and a championship was instead played to decide the best team in Norrland.

Division 2 Sydvästra 1949–50

References
Sweden - List of final tables (Clas Glenning)

Swedish Football Division 2 seasons
2
Sweden